The Ministry of Transport is a government ministry in the Ivory Coast. The Autorité Nationale de l'Aviation Civile (ANAC), the civil aviation agency, is subservient to it.

References

Transport
Ivory
Transport organizations based in Ivory Coast